Méma is a region in Mali, Africa.  A plain of alluvial deposits, it is situated north of Massina; west of Lake Debo and the Inner Niger Delta; and southwest of the Lakes Region. The now-senescent basin may have been the first settlement area for communities who migrated from distressed homelands of the Sahara during the last two millennia BC. Historically, Mema was one of the smaller Soninke states; it was also at one time a province of Ghana Empire.

Toladié, which dates between at least 430 CE and 670 CE, is the largest occupation site (76 hectares) in Mema. As a primary center in the region, Toladié utilized smelted iron tools produced by the communities of Akumbu, Boubou, Boundou, Boulel, Kobadie, Kolima, and Nampala for purposes of tribute and trade with the Ghana Empire.  

At the Akumbu mound complex, in Mema, its findings date between 400 CE and 1400 CE; at the cultural deposit of AK3, which contained three human remains, the dates range between 400 CE and 600 CE. While two out of three human remains were in a fully decomposed state, one of the human remains were able to be determined to be a young adult (17-25 years old) female, who was buried with two copper bracelets - one on each wrist, 13 cowrie shells, 11 stone beads, and a fully intact pot.

References

Landforms of Mali
Plains of Africa